The Darjeeling Limited is a 2007 American comedy-drama film directed by Wes Anderson, which he co-produced with Scott Rudin, Roman Coppola, and Lydia Dean Pilcher, and co-wrote with Roman Coppola and Jason Schwartzman. The film stars Owen Wilson, Adrien Brody, and Schwartzman as three estranged brothers who agree to meet in India a year after their father's funeral for a "spiritual journey" aboard a luxury train. The cast also includes Waris Ahluwalia, Amara Karan, Barbet Schroeder, and Anjelica Huston, with Natalie Portman, Camilla Rutherford, Irrfan Khan, and Bill Murray in cameo roles.

The film was released on October 26, 2007 by Fox Searchlight Pictures. The film received generally favorable reviews from critics and earned $35 million on a $17.5 million budget. The film premiered at the 64th Venice International Film Festival in competition for the Golden Lion and was named among the Top Films of the Year at the 2007 NYFCO Awards.

Anderson's Hotel Chevalier, starring Schwartzman and Portman, acts as a prologue to the film.

Plot
In India, a businessman fails to catch his train, "The Darjeeling Limited", as it pulls out of a station; he is beaten to it by a younger man, Peter Whitman. Peter reunites with his brothers Francis and Jack on board, the three having not seen each other since their father's funeral a year earlier.

Francis, the oldest, has recently survived a near-fatal motorcycle accident, leaving his face and head covered in bandages, and wishes to reconcile with his brothers on a journey of spiritual self-discovery. He is also covertly searching for their mother Patricia, whom the brothers have not seen in many years. With the help of his assistant, Brendan, Francis draws up a strict itinerary for the trip and confiscates his brothers' passports to prevent them from getting off the train too early. The brothers also continue to grieve over their father's death: all three carry many items of luggage marked with his initials, along with other personal items that belonged to him.

The train takes the brothers through the countryside and to various Hindu temples, though tension builds as Peter, and Jack, the youngest, become infuriated with Francis' controlling behavior. Francis eventually reveals that they will be meeting with their mother, who has become a nun living at a Christian convent in the Himalayas. Peter and Jack are angry; Peter knows they would not have come if they had been told this earlier. The atmosphere finally comes to a head, and the brothers have a physical altercation on the train, distressing the other passengers. The Chief Steward, whom the brothers have repeatedly wronged, has them thrown off with all their luggage. Brendan subsequently quits and returns to the train after giving the boys a letter from their mother; its contents imply that she does not want to see them. The brothers thus decide to leave India, go their separate ways, and never return.

After hiking through the wilderness, the brothers see three young boys fall into a river while attempting to pull a raft across it. Jack and Francis rescue two of the boys, but Peter fails to save the third, who dies. They carry the body back to the boys' village, where they spend the night and are treated kindly. They attend the funeral the next day and experience a repressed flashback: accompanied by Alice, Peter's wife, the brothers are shown heading to their father's funeral, and then stopping to pick up his Porsche from the repair shop, even though the car is not ready. It is revealed that their father's death was a result of his being hit by a taxi, and that their mother did not attend the funeral.

Back in the present, the brothers arrive at the airport, but they suddenly decide to rip up their tickets and go visit their mother. They reach the convent, where their mother Patricia is surprised but overjoyed to see them, and Francis coyly admits that his accident was actually a suicide attempt. That night, after the brothers confront Patricia for abandoning them, the family gathers together in silence, and reconnects in love. The brothers awake the next morning to find their mother gone, leaving them their breakfast. They decide not to wait for her to return.

At the train station, the brothers run for another train, the "Bengal Lancer", and gleefully discard all their father's suitcases and bags to catch it. On board, Francis offers to return Peter and Jack their passports, but is told instead to hold onto them. Francis says, "Let's go get a drink, and smoke a cigarette", and the brothers leave their compartment.

Cast

Locations

Much of the film was shot in Jodhpur, Rajasthan. The Himalaya scenes were shot in Udaipur, and the opening scene of the film was also shot on the streets of Jodhpur. The International Airport shown near the end is the old terminal building of Udaipur Airport. The hill featured at the end of the movie is Elephant Hill, Narlai. The scenes set in New York were filmed in Long Island City.

Music and soundtrack

The soundtrack features three songs by The Kinks, "Powerman", "Strangers", and "This Time Tomorrow", all from the 1970 album, Lola Versus Powerman and the Moneygoround, Part One, as well as "Play With Fire" by The Rolling Stones. "Where Do You Go To (My Lovely)" by Peter Sarstedt is prominently featured as well, being played within the film more than once. Most of the album, however, features film score music composed by Bengali filmmaker Satyajit Ray, Merchant Ivory films, and other artists from  Indian cinema. Director Wes Anderson has said that it was Satyajit Ray's movies that made him want to come to India. The works include "Charu's Theme", from Ray's 1964 film Charulata, film-score cues by Shankar Jaikishan and classic works by Debussy and Beethoven. The film ends with the 1969 song "Les Champs-Élysées" by French singer Joe Dassin, who was the son of blacklisted American director Jules Dassin.

Release
The Darjeeling Limited made its world premiere on 3 September 2007 at the Venice Film Festival, where it was in competition for the Golden Lion and won the Little Golden Lion. The film's North American premiere was on 28 September 2007 at the 45th annual New York Film Festival, where it was the opening film. It then opened in a limited commercial release in North America on 5 October 2007.
The film opened across North America on 26 October 2007 and in the UK on 23 November 2007, in both territories preceded in showings by Hotel Chevalier. The film grossed $134,938 in two theaters in its opening weekend, for an average of $67,469 for each theater.

The film (widescreen edition) was released on DVD 26 February 2008 on Fox Searchlight, with features limited to a behind-the-scenes documentary, theatrical trailer, and the inclusion of Hotel Chevalier. The film was re-released by the Criterion Collection on 12 October 2010 on both DVD and Blu-ray, the latter being the film's first release on the format.

Reception
The film received generally favorable reviews from critics. , on the review aggregator Rotten Tomatoes, 69% of critics gave the film positive reviews, based on 193 reviews, with a weighted average of 6.70/10. The site's consensus reads: "With the requisite combination of humor, sorrow, and outstanding visuals, The Darjeeling Limited will satisfy Wes Anderson fans." On Metacritic, the film had an average score of 67 out of 100, based on 35 reviews. The film has a rating of 7.2 out of 10 on the Internet Movie Database.

Roger Ebert of the Chicago Sun-Times gave 3.5 out of 4, calling the film's Indian context as one of its main highlights. Ebert singled out Anderson's script, which, according to Ebert, "uses India not in a touristy way, but as a backdrop that is very, very there." Chris Cabin of Filmcritic.com gave the film 4 stars out of 5 and described Anderson's film as "the auteur's best work to date." Entertainment Weekly film critic Lisa Schwarzbaum gave the film a "B+" and said "This is psychological as well as stylistic familiar territory for Anderson after Rushmore and The Royal Tenenbaums. But there's a startling new maturity in Darjeeling, a compassion for the larger world that busts the confines of the filmmaker's miniaturist instincts."  A.O. Scott of The New York Times said that the film "is unstintingly fussy, vain and self-regarding. But it is also a treasure: an odd, flawed, but nonetheless beautifully handmade object as apt to win affection as to provoke annoyance. You might say that it has sentimental value."

Timothy Knight of Reel.com gave the film 3 stars out of 4 and said "Although The Darjeeling Limited pales in comparison to Anderson's best film, Rushmore (1998), it's still a vast improvement over his last, and worst film, The Life Aquatic with Steve Zissou (2004)." Nathan Lee of The Village Voice wrote "A companion piece to Tenenbaums more than a step in new directions, Darjeeling is a movie about people trapped in themselves and what it takes to get free—a movie, quite literally, about letting go of your baggage." The Christian Science Monitor critic Peter Rainer said "Wes Anderson doesn't make movies like anybody else, which is sometimes a good thing and sometimes not. His latest, The Darjeeling Limited, combines what's best and worst about him." New York Magazine critic David Edelstein said that the film is "hit and miss, but its tone of lyric melancholy is remarkably sustained."

Nick Schager of Slant Magazine gave the film 2 stars out of 4 and said "the ingredients that have increasingly defined Wes Anderson's films...seem, with The Darjeeling Limited, to have become something like limitations." Emanuel Levy gave the film a "C" and said "Going to India and collaborating with two new writers do little to invigorate or reenergize director Wes Anderson in The Darjeeling Limited, because he imposes the same themes, self-conscious approach, and serio-comic sensibility of his previous films on the new one, confining his three lost brothers not only within his limited world, but also within a limited space, a train compartment." Levy also said "after reaching a nadir with his last feature, the $50 million folly The Life Aquatic with Steve Zissou, which was an artistic and commercial flop, Anderson could only go upward." Dana Stevens of Slate magazine wrote, "Maybe Anderson needs to shoot someone else's screenplay, to get outside his own head for a while and into another's sensibility. It's telling that his funniest and liveliest recent work was a commercial for American Express." Kyle Smith of the New York Post gave the film 1 stars out of 4 and said "At a stage in Anderson’s career when he should be moving on, he is instead circling back."

Glenn Kenny of Premiere named it the fifth best film of 2007, and Mike Russell of The Oregonian named it the eighth best film of 2007.

Awards

References

External links
  at Fox Searchlight
 
 
 
The Darjeeling Limited: Voyage to India an essay by Richard Brody at the Criterion Collection

2007 films
2007 comedy-drama films
2000s adventure comedy-drama films
2000s English-language films
2000s road comedy-drama films
American adventure comedy-drama films
American road comedy-drama films
Dune Entertainment films
Fictional trains
Films about dysfunctional families
Films directed by Wes Anderson
Films produced by Wes Anderson
Films produced by Scott Rudin
Films set in Darjeeling
Films set in India
Films set on trains
Films shot in India
Films with screenplays by Wes Anderson
Films with screenplays by Roman Coppola
Fox Searchlight Pictures films
Indian Paintbrush (production company) films
2000s American films